The Headline Woman is a 1935 American crime film directed by William Nigh and starring Heather Angel and Ford Sterling.

The film is also known as The Woman in the Case in the United Kingdom.

Cast
Heather Angel as Myrna Van Buren
Roger Pryor as Bob Grayson
Ford Sterling as Hugo Meyer
Conway Tearle as Police Commissioner Frank Desmond
Robert Gleckler as Harry Chase
Russell Hopton as Craig, Reporter
Jack La Rue as Phil Zarias
Theodore von Eltz as Johnny "Full House" Corinti
Morgan Wallace as Clarkey
Franklin Pangborn as Hamilton, Reporter
Ward Bond as Johnson, Reporter
Wade Boteler as Police Lt. Flanagan
Syd Saylor as Murphy, Reporter
George J. Lewis as O'Shay, Reporter
George "Gabby" Hayes as Police Desk Sgt. Duffy
Wheeler Oakman as Panther Fielding
Lillian Miles as Trini
Warner Richmond as Henchman Bradley
Harry Bowen as Ernie, News Photographer

References

External links

1935 films
American crime drama films
Films about journalists
American black-and-white films
Mascot Pictures films
Films produced by Nat Levine
Films directed by William Nigh
1935 crime drama films
1930s English-language films
1930s American films